TLQP-62 (amino acid 556-617) is a VGF-derived C-terminal peptide that was first discovered by Trani et al. TLQP-62 is derived from VGF precursor protein via proteolytic cleavage by prohormone convertases PC1/3 at the RPR555 site. TLQP-62 is named after its first four N-terminal amino acids and its peptide length.

Function 
Although the receptor(s) for TLQP-62 has not been identified so far, extensive studies have demonstrated that it acts on central nervous system, peripheral nervous system and endocrine tissue to exert its biological functions.

Synaptic plasticity 
Acute TLQP-62 treatment rapidly increases synaptic activity in hippocampal neurons, and potentiates CA1 field excitatory postsynaptic potential fEPSP in the hippocampal slices, thus facilitating hippocampal synaptic transmission. TLQP-62 also increases dendritic branching and length in cultured hippocampal neurons.

Neurogenesis 
TLQP-62 treatment enhances hippocampal neurogenesis both in vitro and in vivo by promoting the proliferation in neuronal progenitor cells.

Antidepressant efficacy 
Intrahippocampal TLQP-62 infusion produces both rapid and sustained antidepressant-like effects in the forced swim test. TLQP-62's processed peptide AQEE-30, when given via intracerebroventricular route, also elicits antidepressant-like effects.

Memory and learning 
Acute intrahippocampal TLQP-62 infusion enhances memory formation via BDNF/TrkB signaling.

Pain 
Acute intrathecal administration of TLQP-62 induces hypersensitivity to mechanical and cold stimuli that recapitulates neuropathic pain, potentially by regulating the excitability of dorsal horn neurons.

Insulin secretion 
TLQP-62 treatment increases insulin secretion in cultured insulinoma cells by increasing intracellular calcium mobilization.

References 

Peptides